John Hall Joyce (5 December 1868 – 17 April 1938) was an English cricketer. Joyce was a right-handed batsman who bowled right-arm fast-medium. He was born at Blackfordby, Leicestershire.

Joyce made a single first-class appearance for Leicestershire against the Marylebone Cricket Club at Lord's in 1894. The Marylebone Cricket Club made 124 in their first-innings, during which Joyce bowled 6 wicketless overs and took 2 catches. Leicestershire made 286 in their first-innings response, with Joyce scoring 18 runs before he was dismissed by Jack Mee. In the Marylebone Cricket Club's second-innings of 254, he took the wickets of Frederic Geeson and Francis Ramsay, finishing with figures of 2/33 from 8 overs. Leicestershire reached their victory target of 93 with 8 wickets in hand, meaning Joyce wasn't required to bat again. This was his only major appearance for Leicestershire.

He died at Vence in France on 17 April 1938. His brothers, Francis and Ralph, both played first-class cricket.

References

External links
John Joyce at ESPNcricinfo
John Joyce at CricketArchive

1868 births
1938 deaths
People from North West Leicestershire District
Cricketers from Leicestershire
English cricketers
Leicestershire cricketers